is a 1957 Japanese film directed by Kimiyoshi Yasuda.

Cast
 Raizo Ichikawa
 Michiko Saga
 Shintaro Katsu
 Michiko Ai
 Narutoshi Hayashi

References

External links
JMDB entry

Japanese black-and-white films
1957 films
Daiei Film films
Films directed by Kimiyoshi Yasuda
1950s Japanese films